Sin by Silence is a domestic violence documentary film by Olivia Klaus that offers a unique gateway into the lives of women who are the tragedies living worst-case scenarios and survivors - women who have killed their abusive husbands. Based on the first inmate-initiated and led support group in the entire United States prison system, the film reveals the history and stories of the members of the group Convicted Women Against Abuse created by inmate Brenda Clubine in 1989. By following five women's abusive experiences that led to their incarceration, the film take viewers on their journeys from victim to survivors, reveals the history of the Battered Women Syndrome in the state of California, and shatters misconceptions. This documentary is a production of Quiet Little Place Productions.

The award-winning film premiered at the Cleveland International Film Festival 2009, and went on to screen nationally as part of the grassroots tour, entitled Stop the Violence, that took the film to over 40 communities in 10 states through the United States. The film sparks awareness about the silent tragedy of domestic violence, while inspiring individuals to connect with advocacy organizations and take everyday actions that improve the quality of their own lives and communities.

In 2011, the film had its television premiere on Investigation Discovery to over 2.2 million viewers.

In 2012, Assemblywoman Fiona Ma introduced AB 1593 and AB 593, The Sin by Silence Bills, inspired by the documentary.  AB 593 seeks to clarify Penal Code 1473.5 to include the domestic violence victims that were unintentionally denied their original writ of habeas corpus due to limited expert testimony evidence. AB 1593 seeks to provide victims of domestic violence who have suffered Intimate Partner Battering (IPB) a chance to present their evidence in an effective way during the parole process. Both bills were signed into law by Governor Brown on September 30, 2012 to ensure the path to freedom for over 7,000 domestic violence survivors currently serving time in California prisons.

Awards
Awards received by Sin by Silence
 2012 Cable Fax for Best Show or Series
 2012 Celebrating Solutions Award for innovations that demonstrate promise in breaking the cycle of domestic violence
 American Library Association's list of Notable Videos for Adults 2011
 Sacramento Film and Music Festival 2009, Audience Award for Best Documentary

Press
Press Coverage of Sin by Silence
 NPR "All Things Considered" - Domestic Abuse Victims Get Chance At Freedom
 HLN, Dr Drew on Call - Women tell Dr. Drew why they killed their partner
 The Daily Beast - Women Who Kill the Men They Love
 Fox News - Film explores world of abused women put behind bars

See also
Domestic Violence Documentaries
 The Conspiracy of Silence, a Public Broadcasting Station (PBS) documentary
 Defending Our Lives, a short documentary
 Power and Control: Domestic Violence in America, a documentary about domestic violence and the community-based Duluth Model to reduce domestic violence
 Silent Voices, a United Kingdom documentary

References

External links 
 
 Sin by Silence Bills information
 Sin by Silence on Facebook
 
 Sin by Silence at Women Make Movies
 Sin by Silence on Investigation Discovery

2009 films
American independent films
American documentary films
Documentary films about violence against women
Films about domestic violence
Violence against women in the United States
2000s English-language films
2000s American films